The Saint Vincent Church is a 16th-century baroque Catholic church in Braga, Portugal, dedicated to Saint Vincent of Saragossa. The Church has been classified as Property of Public Interest since 1986.

Overview 
It was built in 1565 and restored in 1691, on the same site where there was once a Visigoth church of the 7th century (656). In the sacristy there is a stone from that old building with the inscription: Here rests Remismuera since the first of May 618, Monday, in peace, Amen. This is the oldest authentic Christian monument in Braga, and the oldest reference of Segunda-feira, the Christian Portuguese name for Monday.

The façade is completed with the statue of St. Vincent in granite, set in a niche surmounted by the Papal Cross.

The church has a luxurious interior with wood carving work in the altars and azulejos on the walls.

See also 
 St Paul's Church
 Pópulo Church
 Saint Eulália Church

References

External links 

Roman Catholic churches in Braga